Leonovo is a rural locality (a village) in Ugolskoye Rural Settlement, Sheksninsky District, Vologda Oblast, Russia. The population was 19 as of 2002.

Geography 
Leonovo is located 20 km southeast of Sheksna (the district's administrative centre) by road. Nizkiye is the nearest rural locality.

References 

Rural localities in Sheksninsky District